Dr. Joshua Clayton (July 20, 1744 – August 11, 1798) was an American physician and politician from Mt. Pleasant in Pencader Hundred, New Castle County, Delaware. He was an officer of the Continental Army in the American Revolution, and a member of the Federalist Party, who served in the Delaware General Assembly, as Governor of Delaware and as U.S. Senator from Delaware.

Early life and family

Clayton was born near Wyoming, Delaware, son of John Clayton and Eleanor Edinfield. John Clayton was a miller and the grandson of another Joshua Clayton, a Quaker, who came from Lincolnshire, England in the late 17th century. The younger Joshua Clayton went to medical school at, what is now, the University of Pennsylvania from 1757 until 1762, and then began a medical practice in Middletown, Delaware. He became close friends with Richard Bassett, and in 1765, married his adopted daughter, Rachael McCleary.

Clayton acquired a portion of Richard Bassett's Bohemia Manor estate, and in 1773 built their home, Locust Grove. It is now known as the Dickey Farm, and is on the Choptank Road, two miles west of Mt. Pleasant in Pencader Hundred, to the northwest of Middletown. There they had three children who lived to adulthood, Richard, James Lawson and Thomas. Their religious affiliation is unclear, but they were almost certainly members of the Bethel Methodist Church by the time of their deaths.

Military and political career
During the American Revolution, Clayton served in the Bohemia Manor militia, where he had been commissioned a major. He was also an aide and surgeon to General George Washington at the Battle of Brandywine and at Valley Forge.

Following this Clayton served in the House of Assembly in the 1778/79 session, and again from the 1780/81 session through the 1783/84 session. He was back again in the 1785/86 session, and the 1787/88 session. He was chosen President of Delaware by the Delaware General Assembly on May 30, 1789 and served as President until January 15, 1793. Under the provisions of the new Delaware Constitution of 1792 he became the first popularly elected Governor of Delaware and continued to serve in that capacity until his term ended, January 19, 1796.

This new state Constitution was the major political development of these years. With the new U.S. Constitution in place, it was necessary to revise the somewhat experimental Delaware Constitution of 1776. Under the initial leadership of John Dickinson, delegates provided for a real Governor, elected by popular vote and no longer sharing executive authority with the Privy Council. The other major change was to expand the voting franchise by eliminating the property ownership requirement.

Two years after his term ended, Clayton was chosen by the Delaware General Assembly to fill the vacant seat in the United States Senate caused by the resignation of U.S. Senator John M. Vining. He began his term January 19, 1798 and served until his death on August 11, 1798, while still in office. During this term, he served in the Federalist majority in the 5th Congress, during the administration of U.S. President John Adams.

A New State House
During Clayton's tenure it was determined that a new courthouse was needed in Kent County. Since the General Assembly had moved from New Castle in 1777 it had shared the county courthouse with the county officials. They wished to continue to do so in the new building. The county commissioners responsible for erecting the building agreed, but asked for "an appropriation for the completion of the building." In response, on June 2, 1788, a committee of the General Assembly reported that "in their opinion such is the situation of the treasury, together with loud complaints of public creditors and their duty to constituents, that the prayer of the memorial cannot be complied with at this time."

A few days later, though, "all moneys arising from marriage and tavern licenses were appropriated to completing the court-house," and "on July 29, 1791, a bill introduced by Kensey Johns was passed providing for a lottery to raise one thousand pounds for furnishing the court-house."

However, when the building was nearly complete and being occupied by the General Assembly...

on May 3, 1792, it is said that Sheriff John Clayton, by order of the Levy Court, entered the Assembly rooms with drawn sword, and demanded their use for the workmen. The General Assembly there-upon adjourned to the tavern of Thomas Hale, at Duck Creek Cross-Roads and continued their session.

The next day, the State House adopted the following resolution:

Death and legacy
Clayton died at Mt. Pleasant in New Castle County after being stricken with yellow fever while at the United States Congress in Philadelphia. He was first buried at the Locust Grove Cemetery in Pencader Hundred, New Castle County. Later his remains were moved into the Bethel Church Cemetery at Chesapeake City, Maryland. They were moved again to another location in the Bethel Church Cemetery in 1965 upon a widening of the nearby Chesapeake and Delaware Canal.

Clayton's son, Thomas Clayton was a U.S. Senator, and his nephew, John M. Clayton was also a U.S. Senator as well as U.S. Secretary of State.  His great-grandson Henry Clayton built Woodside; listed on the National Register of Historic Places in 1985.

Almanac
Elections were held October 1 and members of the General Assembly took office on October 20 or the following weekday. State Assemblymen had a one-year term. The whole General Assembly chose the State President for a three-year term. The General Assembly also chose the U.S. Senators who took office March 4 for a six-year term. In this case he was completing the existing term, the vacancy caused by the resignation of John M. Vining.

Beginning in 1792 elections were held on the first Tuesday of October and members of the General Assembly took office on the first Tuesday of January. Also in 1792 the State Legislative Council was renamed the State Senate and the State House of Assembly became the State House of Representatives. The State President became the Governor and was popularly elected. He takes office the third Tuesday in January and had a three-year term.

See also
 List of United States Congress members who died in office (1790–1899)

Notes

References

Images
Hall of Governors Portrait Gallery  Portrait courtesy of Historical and Cultural Affairs, Dover

External links
Biographical Directory of the Governors of the United States
Biographical Directory of the United States Congress
Biography by Russell Pickett
Delaware's Governors

The Political Graveyard

Places with more information
Delaware Historical Society; website; 505 North Market Street, Wilmington, Delaware 19801; (302) 655-7161
University of Delaware; Library website; 181 South College Avenue, Newark, Delaware 19717; (302) 831–2965

1744 births
1798 deaths
People from New Castle County, Delaware
People of colonial Delaware
American people of English descent
Methodists from Delaware
Federalist Party United States senators from Delaware
Governors of Delaware
Delaware Federalists
Federalist Party state governors of the United States
Members of the Delaware House of Representatives
Continental Army officers from Delaware
18th-century American politicians
18th-century American physicians
University of Pennsylvania alumni
Deaths from yellow fever
Infectious disease deaths in Delaware
Burials in Maryland